The LG-KM900, or LG Arena, is an LG Electronics flagship multimedia phone for Q1 2009, succeeded by the LG GD900. Announced at the Mobile World Congress on February 16, 2009, the KM900 is the first phone to feature LG’s new 3D S-Class user interface.

The S-Class is a capacitive touch-based 3D UI that lays out menus as if they were on a film reel, enabling the user to drag a finger across the reels to scroll through the available options. Its cube layout provides four home screens that can be customised with different shortcuts. The UI reacts to the orientation of the Arena, switching between portrait and landscape modes.

The Arena is a metal-cased device, available in silver, black Titanium & pink colour schemes. It has a 3-inch WVGA tempered glass multi-touch capable touchscreen with a resolution of 800 x 480 pixels.

The 5-megapixel CMOS Schneider Kreuznach camera with LED flash can record QVGA video at up to 120 frames per second, DVD resolution (720x480) at 30 frames per second or encode H.264 at 15 frames per second. It has both automatic and manual focus options. The camera is thus not as powerful as the one found on the LG Renoir.

The phone has a built in web browser, with HSDPA (7.2 Mbit/s connection) and Wi-Fi capabilities (no WPA-Enterprise). The phone also features multi-touch zooming.

Arena is the first globally released phone to feature Dolby Mobile surround sound. Its FM transmitter can wirelessly feed into car or home stereo systems. Internal memory consists of 8 GB and there is a microSD slot that supports up to a further 32 GB.

In terms of software, Google Mobile Service which includes Google Search, Google Maps, Gmail, YouTube, and Google Blogs is embedded. However, Orange UK have removed these features from the handset.

Firmwares
Although the device is compatible with both Wi-Fi and YouTube, streaming YouTube videos using a wireless network is not possible with most firmware versions, including the newest ones. Some alternative (and older) firmware versions, like V0O_02, implement the solution for this problem, but were not developed by LG and result on device's performance decrease. In September 2009 the V10P_00 version was released and updated the Google Maps version to 2.3.2, as well as some GPS functions, making possible for the handset to find the users' location in under 5 seconds. In older firmware version this would normally take more than 1 minute.

The most user stable and friendly firmware at present is the V10P_00 and V10F_00 which are both open and not locked to any firmware version, it is now possible to unlock the handset to use on any network. Owners of the handset have modded and edited the V10P_00 to allow a windows theme version of the firmware which is impressive.
However, this phone has proven to be very unreliable with a constant tendency to freeze when the user are multi-tasking or try to read a message too quickly after reception.

References

External links
Official LG Arena website
Engadget: video footage of the S-Class UI

KM900 (Arena)
Mobile phones introduced in 2009